Heath Park is a multi-sport venue located at East Brisbane, Queensland, Australia. It is home to Eastern Suburbs F.C.

Development

In 2007, the club added 6 new dressing sheds toilets along with refurbishments to the clubhouse to update what was fast becoming worn out.

In 2008, the Queensland Government handed a $250,000 grant to the Eastern Suburbs F.C. to re-turf the playing field, due to the drought Queensland had suffered. The grant also went towards two new dressing sheds to cope with the rising number of female players at the club.

See also

Sport in Brisbane

References

Soccer venues in Queensland
Rugby league stadiums in Australia
Sports venues in Brisbane